Ariulf Eric Hampe (22 November 1922 – 28 May 2009) was a German immigrant, who migrated to the United States. He was instrumental in designing the Saturn V rocket, along with Dr. Wernher von Braun, which landed the first man on the moon.

References

1922 births
2009 deaths
German emigrants to the United States
American aerospace engineers
20th-century American engineers